The morphology of Irish is in some respects typical of an Indo-European language. Nouns are declined for number and case, and verbs for person and number. Nouns are classified by masculine or feminine gender. Other aspects of Irish morphology, while typical for an Insular Celtic language, are not typical for Indo-European, such as the presence of inflected prepositions and the initial consonant mutations. Irish syntax is also rather different from that of most Indo-European languages, due to its use of the verb–subject–object word order.

Syntax 

Word order in Irish is of the form VSO (verb–subject–object) so that, for example, "He hit me" is  [hit-past tense]  [he]  [me].

Examples are:
. "He is a man." (Spanish , Portuguese )
. "He is cold (a cold-hearted person)." (Spanish , Portuguese )
. "He/Thomas is cold" (= feels cold) (Alt. Tá fuacht air [= "Cold is on him"]). (Spanish  – in this case Spanish uses 'tener' (to have) instead of 'estar' (to be), Portuguese )
. "He is asleep." (Spanish , Portuguese )
. "He is good (a good person)." (Spanish , Portuguese )
. "He is well." (Spanish , Portuguese )

Nouns

The prepositional case is called the dative by convention.

Irish nouns are masculine or feminine. To a certain degree the gender difference is indicated by specific word endings,  and  being masculine and  feminine. While the neuter has mostly disappeared from vocabulary, the neuter gender is seen in various place names in Ireland.

Articles

In the genitive singular,  with lenition is used with masculine nouns,  with feminine nouns. In the dative singular,  may cause lenition or eclipsis depending on the preposition preceding it and on regional norms (in Ulster usage, lenition is standard with all prepositions, while in other regions eclipsis is used with many).  is the only plural form of the article; it causes eclipsis in the genitive for both genders, and no mutation in other cases.

Names of countries usually take the definite article in the nominative:  "France,"  "Brazil,"  "Japan." Exceptions to this include  "Ireland,"  "Scotland" and  "England."

There is no indefinite article in Irish; the word appears by itself, for example:  – "I have a pen",  – "There's a dog in the room".

When two definite noun phrases appear as part of a genitive construction (equivalent to the X of the Y in English), only the noun phrase in the genitive takes the article.

Adjectives

Irish adjectives always follow the noun. The adjective is influenced by the case, number and gender of the noun preceding it.

  "The small girl" – masculine singular nominative
  "The poor woman" – feminine singlar nominative
  "The young boys" – masculine plural nominative

Adjectives in Irish have two morphological degrees of comparison: the positive, e.g.  "the boy is friendly", and the comparative, e.g.  "the girl is nicer than the boy".  A superlative sense is rendered by the comparative in a relative clause, e.g.  "Seán is the nicest child of the three".

Adverbs 
Irish adverbs are used to modify verbs, adjectives and other adverbs.

An adverb can be created from an adjective by adding go before it, e.g. go mall, go tapaigh, go maith, etc. If the adjective begins with a vowel, h is added before it, e.g. go hálainn, go híseal, go háirithe, etc.

Adverbs can often be created from nouns by putting a preposition before them, e.g. ar bith, de ghnáth, faoi dheireadh, etc.

Other categories of adverbs include the following:

Adverbs that describe relation to time, e.g. uaireanta, anois, cheana, etc.

Adverbs that describe relation to place, e.g. ann, abhaile, amuigh, etc.

Adverbs used in questions, e.g. cathain?, conas?, cá?, etc.

Adverbs used for negation, e.g. ní, nach, nár, etc.

Other adverbs, e.g. áfach, chomh maith, ach oiread, etc.

Verbs

There are two conjugations and 11 irregular verbs. Tenses or moods are formed by inflecting the stem, and in the past and habitual past tenses and the conditional mood also by leniting any initial consonant. The inflected tense and mood forms are: present indicative, present habitual indicative (differs from present only in the verb  "to be"), future, past indicative, past habitual indicative, conditional, imperative, present subjunctive, and past subjunctive. Examples of tense conjugations: (all third person forms without subject pronoun):

 1st conjugation:  "to leave" –  (past) –  (present) –  (future) –  (conditional) –  (habitual past) –  (subjunctive) –  (imperative)
 2nd conjugation:  "to buy" –  (past) –  (present) –  (future) –  (conditional) –  (habitual past) –  (subjunctive) –  (imperative)
 Irregular:  "to go" –  (past) –  (present) –  (future) –  (conditional) –  (habitual past) –  (subjunctive) –  (imperative)

Verbs can be conjugated either synthetically (with the personal pronoun included in the verb inflection) or analytically (with the verb inflected for tense only and a separate subject). However, the official standard generally prescribes the analytic form in most person-tense combinations, and the synthetic in only some cases, such as the first person plural. The analytic forms are also generally preferred in the western and northern dialects, except in answer to what would in English be "yes/no" questions, while Munster Irish prefers the synthetic forms. For example, the following are the standard form, synthetic form and analytical form of the past tense of  "to run":

Pronouns

Personal pronouns
Personal pronouns in Irish do not inflect for case, but there are three different sets of pronouns used: conjunctive forms, disjunctive forms, and emphatic forms (which may be used either conjunctively or disjunctively)

Conjunctive forms
The normal word order in Irish is verb–subject–object (VSO). The forms of the subject pronoun directly following the verb are called conjunctive.

The form  in the 1st person plural has only recently been approved for use in the official standard, but is very common in western and northern dialects. The standard and southern dialects have no subject pronoun in the 1st person plural, using the synthetic verb ending  (alternatively ) instead.

Irish has no T–V distinction, i.e. it does not differentiate between formal and familiar forms of second person pronouns.

There is no equivalent to the English "it". The exception is the pronoun , used in impersonal copula phrases, particularly in the phrases  (> ) "yes", "so", "that is so",  (the opposite of ),  "is that not so?",  (Kerry ) "Is that so?",  "it's a man", and so on.

Disjunctive forms
If a pronoun is not the subject or if a subject pronoun does not follow the verb (as in a verbless clause, or as the subject of the copula, where the pronoun stands at the end of the sentence), the so-called disjunctive forms are used:

In Munster dialects the form  is either (a) archaic (replaced by ) or (b) is only found after words ending in a vowel.

Standard ("I hit you", present tense),  ("I hit you", past tense)
Dialect type (a), 
Dialect type (b),

Intensive forms
Irish also has intensive pronouns, used to give the pronouns a bit more weight or emphasis.

The word  ( or ) "-self" can follow a pronoun, either to add emphasis or to form a reflexive pronoun.

 "I did it myself."
 "Did you hurt yourself?"
 is thus "We Ourselves"

Prepositional pronouns
As the object of a preposition, a pronoun is fused with the preposition; one speaks here of "inflected" prepositions, or, as they are more commonly termed, prepositional pronouns.

Possessive pronouns
The possessive determiners cause different initial consonant mutations.

Notes

 L= causes lenition on the next word.
 H= adds h- to the next vowel sound.
 E= causes eclipsis of the next word.

These forms (especially  and ) can also blend with certain prepositions:

The object of a verbal noun is in the genitive case:
 "He's discussing his bicycle" (lit.: He is at the discussing of his bicycle)

Similarly, if the object of the verbal noun is a pronoun, then it is a possessive pronoun:
 "He's discussing it." (lit.: He is at its (i.e. the bicycle's) discussing)

More examples:
 "She's hitting me."
 "They are discussing you."
 "He's kissing her."
 "You're hitting us."
 "I'm discussing you (pl.)."
 "You (pl.) are kissing them."

Interrogative pronouns
Interrogative pronouns introduce a question, e.g. the words who, what, which. The Irish equivalents are:
 "who?, which?"
 or  "what?"
 "which?"

Examples:
 "Who did it?"
 "Who did you see?"
 "Who did you give the book to?"
 "What's wrong (with you)?" (lit. "What is on you?")
 "What did you say?"
 "What's your name?" (lit. "Which name is upon you?")
 "How old are you?" (lit. "Which age are you?")

Numbers

There are three kinds of cardinal numbers in Irish: disjunctive numbers, nonhuman conjunctive numbers, and human conjunctive numbers.

Disjunctive numbers
Disjunctive numbers are used for example in arithmetic, in telling time, in telephone numbers and after nouns in forms like  "bus 13" or  "room 2".

Conjunctive numbers

Nonhuman conjunctive numbers
Nonhuman conjunctive numbers are used to count nouns that do not refer to human beings, e.g.  "horse"

"head") when it concerns things and animals, e.g.:
 "I have five horses; one of them is sick."

Human conjunctive numbers
Human conjunctive numbers are used to count nouns that refer to human beings, e.g. páiste 'child'

"person") with people. The other "personal" numbers can also be used pronominally, e.g.:
 "I have five children; one of them is sick."
 "Six people are in the room."

Phonology

A notable feature of Irish phonology is that consonants (except ) come in pairs, one "broad" (velarized, pronounced with the back of the tongue pulled back towards the soft palate) and one "slender" (palatalized, pronounced with the middle of the tongue pushed up towards the hard palate).

References

External links

 
Grammar